John Frederick, Prince of Schwarzburg-Rudolstadt (8 January 1721 in Rudolstadt – 10 July 1767 in ibid) was the ruling Prince of Schwarzburg-Rudolstadt from 1744 to 1767.

Life 
John Frederick von Schwarzburg-Rudolstadt was the only son of Frederick Anton, Prince of Schwarzburg-Rudolstadt and his first wife, Princess Sophia Wilhelmina of Saxe-Coburg-Saalfeld.

John Frederick mastered the French language. Between 1738 and 1742, John Frederick made a Grand Tour.  He attended lectures on theology at the University of Strasbourg and lectures on mathematics and physics at the University of Utrecht.  During his Grand Tour, he came into contact with the ideas of the Age of Enlightenment.  He later tried to reconcile these ideas with his faith.

In 1742, John Frederick represented his father at the coronation of Emperor Charles.  The ceremony in Frankfurt Cathedral lasted several hours and John Frederick found it very impressive.

In 1744, at the age of 23, he inherited the Principality of Schwarzburg-Rudolstadt.  He continued the Heidecksburg construction project his father had begun.  His father had built the exterior of the castle, John Frederick took up decorating the interior.  He commissioned frescoed ceilings and overdoor ornaments.  In 1750, the ballroom was completed by Gottfried Heinrich Krohne.  It is considered a prime example of Rococo interior design in Germany.

The princely collection of sheet music had been lost in a fire in 1735.  John Frederick started a new collection to replace it.  Georg Gebel composed at least nine opera libretti and about a hundred symphonies, partitas and concerts.  In 1746, John Frederick rewarded him with the title of Concertmeister and in 1750 with the title of Kapellmeister.  In 1754, Christian Gotthelf Scheinpflug succeeded gebel as Kapellmeister.  He composed music for all kinds of courtly occasions.

In 1746, he founded a theological seminary and supported the founding of an extensive public library. He added his private library to the existing collection and from 1751 onwards, he allowed the general public to access it once a week. He considerably extended the collection of the "Princely public library Rudolstadt", founded in 1748, be purchasing scientific literature and numerous valuable books, incunables and oriental manuscripts.

On 4 October 1760, John Frederick granted a license to operate a porcelain factory to Georg Heinrich Macheleid.  John Frederick himself acted as a director for this company, which still exists under the name of Aelteste Volkstedter Porzellanmanufaktur.

On 20 January 1764, the local gymnasium celebrated its centenary.  On this occasion, John Frederick officially named the building  and added a position teaching mathematics and physics.  The ceremony was attended by the Prince and the entire princely household.

John Frederick died on 10 July 1767.  As he had no male heir, he was succeeded by his uncle Louis Günther II.  In 1763, Louis Günther II's eldest son, the new Hereditary Prince Frederick Charles, had married John Frederick's eldest daughter, Frederike.

Marriage and issue 

John Frederick married on 19 November 1744 in Eisenach to Princess Bernardina Christina Sophia of Saxe-Weimar-Eisenach (1724–1757).  They had the following children:
 Princess Frederike of Schwarzburg-Rudolstadt (1745–1778); married on 1763 Frederick Charles, Prince of Schwarzburg-Rudolstadt (1736-1793)
 Daughter (1746-1746)
 Son (1747-1747)
 Princess Sophie Ernestine of Schwarzburg-Rudolstadt (1749–1754)
 Princess Wilhelmina of Schwarzburg-Rudolstadt (1751–1780); married in 1766 Louis, Prince of Nassau-Saarbrücken (1745-1794).
 Princess Henrietta Charlotte of Schwarzburg-Rudolstadt (1752–1756)

Ancestry

References 
 Bernhard Anemüller: Johann Friedrich Fürst zu Schwarzburg-Rudolstadt 1721 bis 1767, 1864
 Jens Henkel and Lutz Unbehaun: Die Fürsten von Schwarzburg-Rudolstadt, Thüringer Landesmuseum Heidecksburg, Rudolstadt, 1997 (3rd ed.: 2001), 
 Johann Christian August Junghans: Geschichte der schwarzburgischen Regenten, Leipzig, 1821, online, viewed on 2 march 2012
 Friedrich Apfelstedt: Das Haus Kevernburg-Schwarzburg von seinem Ursprunge bis auf unsere Zeit: dargestellt in den Stammtafeln seiner Haupt- und Nebenlinien und mit biographischen Notizen über die wichtigsten Glieder derselben, Bertram, Sondershausen, 1890,

Footnotes

House of Schwarzburg
Princes of Schwarzburg-Rudolstadt
1721 births
1767 deaths
18th-century German people